The Tuanpai, or Youth League Faction, is a term used by political observers and analysts to describe an informal political faction in the Chinese Communist Party (CCP), which includes cadres and government officials who originated from the Communist Youth League. There have been two "Youth League factions" in recent memory, without direct political lineage between each other. The first, in the 1980s, comprised cadres of Youth League background who supported CCP general secretary Hu Yaobang: the term "Tuanpai" was originally used to criticise Hu Yaobang for over-reliance of cadres of Youth League background. The second, from the 2000s, comprised CCP general secretary Hu Jintao and his group of populist associates and other political allies. As of 2022, little evidence exists that the group still exists.

Characteristics

First Youth League faction

Members of the original Youth League faction were reformist members of the Communist Party leadership who had risen into positions of power with the rise of Hu Yaobang at the end of the Cultural Revolution in the late 1970s. Like Hu, many of them had been part of the Communist Youth League leadership in the 1950s and 1960s, and had in their youths either participated directly in the Communist Party's armed forces, or in the anti-Kuomintang student movement, during the Chinese Civil War. In contrast to the more conservative "elders" who still had influence behind the scenes, the Youth League faction were younger, more liberal in political outlook, and enthusiastic in devising and implementing political and economic reform. Many of them played key roles in Hu Yaobang's programme of reform in the 1980s.

The Youth League faction was greatly weakened when Hu Yaobang was sidelined in an internal power struggle instigated by the conservative faction. Some members continued to serve under Zhao Ziyang, Hu's replacement as party leader and also a reformist, while others were moved into less important positions. When Zhao was also deposed in 1989, many remaining members of the Youth League faction were purged from the Party leadership, and the faction ceased to exist as such.

Second Youth League faction
Hu Jintao became the General Secretary of the Chinese Communist Party in 2002. Hu Jintao also has a background in the Communist Youth League (though he is of a younger generation than Hu Yaobang's Youth League colleagues). Hu's rise to power roused interest in members of the party leadership who, like him, had a background in the Youth League. Hu Jintao is himself sometimes counted as a member of the first Youth League faction, as he was promoted to head the Youth League under Hu Yaobang's leadership. However, the younger Hu's subsequent rise to power owed more to the patronage of Deng Xiaoping and other party elders than that of the elder Hu. As a result, there is no direct political lineage between the two Youth League factions.

Political analyst Cheng Li of Brookings Institution divides the contemporary Communist Party power structure into two distinct "coalitions" - one of "Populists" and the other of "Elitists". Elitists are classified as those who originate mostly in China's rich coastal provinces, notably Shanghai, or those who have a family background of high-ranking Communist Party officials (i.e. the Princelings). The Youth League faction, on the other hand, belongs to the "Populist" faction, consisting of officials who have relatively humble backgrounds and who have climbed through the power structure from the grassroots. While the Elitists were more concerned with economic growth and market functionality, the Populists were more focused on societal harmony and decreasing inequality, Li explains. He places the Youth League faction at the core of the Populist coalition. The Youth League faction's members usually have higher education qualifications, normally they all have university degrees or higher.

Suggested members of the first Youth League faction

Hu Yaobang, CCP Chairman and later General Secretary (demoted 1987)
Hu Qili, member of the Politburo Standing Committee (demoted 1989)
Hu Jintao, Youth League first secretary (later CCP General Secretary, PRC President)
Li Ruihuan, member of Politburo Standing Committee, CPPCC Chairman
Wang Zhaoguo, CCP General Office chief, Secretary of the Secretariat, later governor of Fujian

Although Wen Jiabao was never a member of the Youth League, because he was a protegee of Hu Yaobang and close to Hu Jintao since his Youth League tenure, observers and analysts often include Wen in this faction.

Suggested members of the second Youth League faction

Hu Jintao, former CCP General Secretary, former PRC President 
Li Keqiang, Premier, Politburo Standing Committee member
Wang Yang, CPPCC chairman, Politburo Standing Committee member
Hu Chunhua, Third Vice Premier, Politburo member
Liu Yandong, former Second Vice-Premier, Former Politburo member
Li Yuanchao, former vice president, Former Politburo member
Zhang Baoshun, former Anhui party secretary
Zhou Qiang, President of the Supreme People's Court
Yuan Chunqing, former Shanxi party secretary
Ling Jihua, head of the United Front Work Department (expelled 2015)
Lu Hao, Minister of Natural Resources

See also
Hu Jintao's departure from the 20th National Congress of the Chinese Communist Party
Princelings
Shanghai clique

References

External links
One party, two coalitions in China's politics
China's Team of Rivals
China's 'fifth generation' leaders come of age

 
Factions of the Chinese Communist Party
Youth wings of communist parties